Orthomene is a genus of flowering plants belonging to the family Menispermaceae.

Its native range is Panama to Southern Tropical America and Trinidad.

Species
Species:

Orthomene hirsuta 
Orthomene prancei 
Orthomene schomburgkii 
Orthomene verruculosa

References

Menispermaceae
Menispermaceae genera